Streptomyces violascens is a bacterium species from the genus of Streptomyces which has been isolated from soil. Streptomyces violascens produces violapyrone A – G, L-glutamate oxidase and albaflavenoid.

Further reading

See also 
 List of Streptomyces species

References

External links
Type strain of Streptomyces violascens at BacDive -  the Bacterial Diversity Metadatabase	

violascens
Bacteria described in 1958